The British decimal two pence coin (often shortened to 2p in writing and speech) is a denomination of sterling coinage equalling  of a pound. Since the coin's introduction on 15 February 1971, the year British currency was decimalised, its obverse has featured four profiles of Queen Elizabeth II. In 2008 the design on its reverse changed from the original depiction of a plume of ostrich feathers with a coronet to a segment of the Royal Shield.

The two pence coin was originally minted from bronze, but changed in 1992 to copper-plated steel.

As of March 2014 there were an estimated 6.55 billion 2p coins in circulation corresponding to a value of £131 million.

Two pence coins are legal tender for amounts only up to the sum of 20p when offered in repayment of a debt; however, the coin's legal tender status is not normally relevant for everyday transactions.

Composition 
From its first minting in 1971 until 1992, two pence coins were made from bronze. In 1992, this was changed to copper-plated steel because of the increasing price of copper used to make bronze. Both the bronze and steel versions were made in 1992 only.

By May 2006 the pre-1992 (97% copper) coins contained 3p worth of copper each. In May 2006, about 2.55 billion such coins remained in circulation, and the Royal Mint warned that tampering with coinage is illegal in the UK. During 2008, the value of copper fell dramatically from these peaks.

Design

Reverse 
The original reverse of the coin, designed by Christopher Ironside, and used from 1971 to 2008, is the Badge of the Prince of Wales: a plume of ostrich feathers within a coronet, above the German motto  ("I serve"). A small number of 1983 mintage coins exist with the "New Pence" wording. It was originally planned that an alternative version of the 2p would be minted with a design representing Northern Ireland; these plans never came to fruition. The same design was also re-cut in 1993 producing two minor varieties for that year.

In August 2005 the Royal Mint launched a competition to find new reverse designs for all circulating coins apart from the £2 coin. The winner, announced in April 2008, was Matthew Dent, whose designs were gradually introduced into the circulating British coinage from mid-2008. The designs for the 1p, 2p, 5p, 10p, 20p and 50p coins depict sections of the Royal Shield that form the whole shield when placed together. The shield in its entirety was featured on the now-obsolete round £1 coin.

The beading was removed from both sides of the coin in the 2008 re-design.

Obverse 
To date, five different obverses have been used: four different portraits and the removal of the beaded border in 2008. In the original design both sides of the coin are encircled by dots, a common feature on coins, known as beading. 

Four different portraits of the Queen have been used on the coin:

 As with all new decimal currency, until 1984 the portrait of Queen Elizabeth II by Arnold Machin appeared on the obverse, in which the Queen wears the 'Girls of Great Britain and Ireland' Tiara.
 Between 1985 and 1997 the portrait by Raphael Maklouf was used, in which the Queen wears the George IV State Diadem. In 1992 the metal used in minting this coin was switched from bronze to copper-plated steel, with a single year of using both alloys in 1998.
 As of June 2015, coins bearing the portrait by Jody Clark have been seen in circulation.

Status as legal tender 
2p coins are legal tender for amounts up to and including 20 pence. However, in the UK, "legal tender" has a very specific and narrow meaning which relates only to the repayment of debt to a creditor, not to everyday shopping or other transactions. Specifically, coins of particular denominations are said to be "legal tender" when a creditor must by law accept them in redemption of a debt. The term does not mean - as is often thought - that a shopkeeper has to accept a particular type of currency in payment. A shopkeeper is under no obligation to accept any specific type of payment, whether legal tender or not; conversely they have the discretion to accept any payment type they wish.

Mintages
Mintage figures below represent the number of coins of each date released for circulation. Mint Sets have been produced since 1982; where mintages on or after that date indicate 'none', there are examples contained within those sets.

References

External links
Royal Mint – 2p coin
Two Pence, Coin Type from United Kingdom

Coins of the United Kingdom
Currencies introduced in 1971
Decimalisation
Two-cent coins